Act II or Act Two or Act 2 may refer to:

Brands
 Act II (popcorn), a brand of popcorn in North America

Music
 Act Two (Collabro album), 2014
 Act Two (The Seldom Scene album), 1973
 Act II (Tokio album), 2005
 Act II: The Father of Death, an album by The Protomen, 2009
 Act II: The Meaning of, and All Things Regarding Ms. Leading, an album by The Dear Hunter, 2007
 Act 2: The Blood and the Life Eternal, an album by Neverending White Lights, 2006
 "Act II", 1993 concert tour by Prince; see Act I and II
 Act II: The Patents of Nobility (The Turn), an album by Jay Electronica, 2020

See also 
 Act Too Group, Sussex UK theatre troupe
 Act (drama), a division or unit of a drama
 Act III (disambiguation)
 Act One (disambiguation)